This article concerns the period 879 BC – 870 BC.

Events and trends
879 BC—Death of Zhou yi wang, King of the Zhou Dynasty of China.
879 BC—Kalhu is dedicated. Some historians say that Assurnasirpal II gives a banquet for 69,574 persons to celebrate it.
878 BC—Zhou li wang becomes King of the Zhou Dynasty of China.
877 BC—Parshvanatha, the 23rd Tirthankara of Jainism was born in India.
874 BC—Osorkon II succeeds Takelot I as king of the Twenty-second dynasty of Egypt.
874 BC—Ahab becomes king of Israel (approximate date).
872 BC—An exceptionally high flood of the Nile covers the floors of the Temple of Luxor.
871 BC—Asa the King of Judah dies after sitting on the throne for 41 years.
Jehu, king of Israel, is born (approximate date).
Ahaziah, king of Judah, is born (approximate date).

References

Bibliography